John H. Harvey (born September 28, 1943) is an American social psychologist and Professor Emeritus in the Department of Psychological & Brain Sciences at the University of Iowa. He was elected to the Society of Experimental Social Psychology in 1976. He was named a fellow of the American Psychological Association in 1978 and the American Psychological Society in 1991. He served as the founding editor-in-chief of the Journal of Social and Clinical Psychology from 1983 to 1988. In 2000, he received the Distinguished Career Award from the International Society for the Study of Personal Relationships.

References

External links
Faculty page
Profile at Social Psychology Network

Living people
American social psychologists
University of Iowa faculty
People from McKinney, Texas
1943 births
University of South Carolina alumni
University of Missouri alumni
Texas Tech University faculty
Academic journal editors
Fellows of the American Psychological Association